MBG may refer to:
 Marble Blast Gold, 2002 3D platform game
 Medal for Bravery (Gold), rank of the Hong Kong honours system
 Missouri Botanical Garden (more commonly referred to as MoBot)
 Money-back guarantee, a simple guarantee